Gábor Mészáros (born 15 March 1962) is a Hungarian swimmer. He competed in four events at the 1980 Summer Olympics.

References

External links
 
 

1962 births
Living people
Hungarian male swimmers
Olympic swimmers of Hungary
Swimmers at the 1980 Summer Olympics
Swimmers from Budapest